The Tigray Defense Forces (TDF: ሓምት), colloquially called the Tigray Army is a paramilitary group located in the Tigray region of Ethiopia. It was founded by former generals of the Ethiopian Military in 2020 to combat federal forces enforcing national government mandates in the Tigray region, culminating in 2020 with the outbreak of the Tigray War. The TDF has made use of guerilla tactics and strategies. Human rights groups including Amnesty International and Human Rights Watch have reported that the TDF has committed war crimes against civilians including gang rape and extrajudicial killing during their occupation of both the Afar and Amhara regions. According to the Ethiopian Ministry of Justice, TDF combatants have been found liable for upwards of 540 civilians casualties. as of 28 December 2021.

Overview 
The Tigray Defense Forces consist of the Special Forces of the Tigray Regional government, ENDF defectors, local militia, members of Tigrayan regional political parties including the TPLF, National Congress of Great Tigray, Salsay Weyane Tigray, Tigray Independence Party and others, as well as numerous youth who fled to the mountains.

Internally, analysts believe that the relative influence of the TPLF has been weakened to the benefit of newer elements within the TDF.

Leadership 
Many TDF officers and non-commissioned officers defected from the ENDF in the lead up to and during the Tigray War. In a Zoom meeting with Tigray diaspora activists in June 2021, President of the Tigray region, Debretsion Gebremichael, stated that the TDF is led by a central command which coordinates their military actions.

Lieutenant General Tsadkan Gebretensae, who was the Ethiopian national forces commander in chief until 2001, became the TDF commander in chief and remained in that post until March 2021, when he became a member of the Central Command.

Lieutenant General Tadesse Werede Tesfay is part of the command and Commander-in-Chief of the TDF since March 2021.

Brigadier General Migbey Haile is Commander of the Army.

Brigadier General Abraha Tesfay is Commander of Army.

=== Transition from regular to guerrilla force ===
"Before the outbreak of hostilities, the TPLF-controlled regional militia functioned as a more traditional military force that was well-supplied and trained in the use of heavy weapons. The ENDF and the Ethiopian Air Force successfully targeted the TPLF-led regional militia’s heavy equipment during the first weeks of the war. However, much of this equipment was abandoned by the TPLF before it was targeted. The TPLF leadership knew that such equipment would be useless for the kind of war that they would have to wage."

Recruitment and strategy 
According to the Jamestown Foundation; "Young men and women—many of whom fear being raped or murdered—are fleeing to areas under the nominal control of the TDF. The TDF is also accused of carrying out attacks on Amhara civilians."

Members of Tigrayan civil society have also joined the TDF, including Professor Kindeya Gebrehiwot, previous president of Mekelle University; Desta Gebremedhin, previous journalist of BBC World, numerous popular musicians, and Professor Mulugeta Gebrehiwot, a peace researcher.

The TDF has been accused of forced recruitment, including the usage of child soldiers. According to Tigrayan administrative officials, each household in Tigray was required to enlist one member in the TDF, and those who refused detained and jailed, including the parents of children who refused enlistment. As well as forced recruitment and enlistment quotas, the Jamestown Foundation has said, "The Ethiopian government's scorched earth strategy in Tigray has all but ensured the alienation of most Tigrayans. It has also ensured that the TDF will have no shortage of committed fighters and sympathetic supporters within Tigray." and that, "After the ENDF and soldiers from the Eritrean Army took over Tigray’s major towns, TDF forces retreated to strongholds in the mountainous central interior of the region. There, the TDF consolidated forces and re-organized for a transition to guerrilla-style combat... Following what was a strategic retreat to the rugged interior, TDF forces re-organized into small, highly-mobile, lightly armed, detachments of ten to eighty fighters. These detachments were then further divided into mission-specific units."

War crimes 

The TDF have been implicated in numerous war crimes in Afar and Amhara Regions to include the extrajudicial killings of civilians, indiscriminate shelling and shooting, rape as a weapon of war, use of civilians as human shields, and widespread looting and destruction of civilian infrastructure and private property.

Multiple international news organizations reported that the TDF has razed a village near Kobbo, North Wollo These reports show satellite imagery of the village before and after being burned.

References 

2020 establishments in Ethiopia
2020 establishments in Tigray
2020 in Ethiopia
2021 in Ethiopia
D
Military units and formations established in 2020
Tigray War
Wars involving Eritrea
Wars involving Ethiopia
2022 in Ethiopia